is the 8th single of Japanese girl group Kalafina. The title track is used as an ending theme (episode 8) and insert song in the anime series Kuroshitsuji II.

Track list

Charts

References

2010 songs
2010 singles
Songs written by Yuki Kajiura
Kalafina songs
Anime songs